Anna of Constantinople may refer to:

Anna of Constantinople (born 888) (888–912), daughter of Leo VI the Wise and wife of Louis the Blind
Anna Porphyrogenita (963–1011), sister of Basil II and wife of Vladimir the Great